Leah Victoria Park is an Irish football ground situated in Tullamore, Co. Offaly. It is the home of Tullamore Town F.C. The ground has three pitches in total, two which are of international standard and an all-weather pitch.

External links
Tullamore Town F.C. Official website

References

Buildings and structures in Tullamore
Association football venues in the Republic of Ireland
Sport in Tullamore
Sports venues in County Offaly